Jeff Long is an American writer and researcher. He is a recipient of the 1993 Boardman Tasker Prize for Mountain Literature for his work, The Ascent.

Bibliography

Fiction

Angels of Light (1987)
The Ascent (1993)
Empire of Bones (1993,)
The Descent (#1, 1999)
Year Zero (2003)
The Reckoning (2004)
The Wall (2006)
Deeper: A Novel (#2, 2007)
Too Close to God (2015)

Non-fiction
Outlaw: The Story of Claude Dallas (1986)
Duel of Eagles: The Mexican and U.S. Fight for the Alamo (1991)

References

External links
 

20th-century male writers
Boardman Tasker Prize winners
Living people
Year of birth missing (living people)